The Potez 8D is the largest member of the Potez D series of air-cooled piston aircraft engines which share several common features.

Design and development
In the 1930s Potez planned a series of new engines to replace their Anzani-derived radial engines. The Potez 4D, a four-cylinder inverted inline engine ran before World War II but did not reach production until the late 1940s, when it was joined by another inverted inline, the six cylinder Potez 6D, and the eight cylinder inverted-V 8D. The D-series engines had much in common, most obviously sharing pistons and cylinders, with the same stroke, bore and valve gear.  The larger 8D required an enhanced though similar lubrication system and different connecting rods because of its 90° V layout.

A 8D.32 powered the first prototype of the Potez 75 ground attack aircraft but budget cuts in 1957 led to the cancellation of an order for 15 pre-series and 100 series machines.

Variants
8D-00
8D-10
8D-20
8D-30Tractor configuration  
8D-32Pusher configuration, with stepped up engine driven cooling fan.
8D-40

Applications
 Potez 75

Specifications

References

Further reading

8D
1940s aircraft piston engines